Milad Ghamari (born 28 March 1995) is an Iranian football goalkeeper currently playing for Tractor.

References

External links
Milad Ghamari at Iran League

1995 births
Living people
Iranian footballers
People from Qazvin
Tractor S.C. players
Association football goalkeepers